The Academia Británica Cuscatleca (ABC) is an established and highly regarded international bilingual school in El Salvador. It is a community of some 1300 students and is fully accredited by Council of International Schools (CIS), the International Baccalaureate Organisation (IBO), the International Primary Curriculum (IPC) and the Values-Based Trust for Education (VBFT).  

The United Kingdom Department for Education number of the school is 7036495. Applications to attend the school should be made via the Admissions link on the school website. The School recruits staff from overseas and from El Salvador each year. Positions are posted on the Recruitment link on the school website.

The ABC is the school of the Fundación Escolar Británico Salvadoreña, a non-profit foundation established in 1970 to provide a British/Salvadoran international style education. The school is values-based seeking to develop "responsible outstanding citizens" who will make a difference in the world. The school recently received the Values-based education Quality Mark following a visit by Dr Neil Hawkes. The school actively promotes its agreed shared values through all aspect of school life. The school's motto is 'Effort leads to success'

History 
The Fundación Escolar Británico Salvadoreña was founded in 1970 and the ABC was opened in February 1971 and has been an International Baccalaureate Diploma school since 1982. The school is fully accredited by the Council of International Schools. The school actively participates in the Duke of Edinburgh International Award and the International Global Citizens Award .

Academic programme 
The ABC consists of a Primary school and a Secondary school within a supportive overall school structure. The academic programme includes the English National Curriculum, the International Primary Curriculum, the University of Cambridge IGCSE, the International Baccalaureate Diploma and the Salvadoran Ministry of Education requirements. The school became the first IPC accredited school in Latin America in 2017 and recently completed the IB Five Year review as an IB World School.

Primary school 
The Head of Primary and two Deputy Headteachers have overall responsibility for the school, coordinating a staff of over 50 teachers and 27 Teaching Assistants. Senior members of the teaching staff co-ordinate each key stage, subject area and grade level group. Full-time learning assistants provide support in the classrooms from Pre-Kinder to 3rd grade, with additional assistants supporting Numeracy and Literacy in the 4th and 5th grade.

Throughout the Primary School, lessons are based on the English National Curriculum and the International Primary Curriculum. Swimming, Physical Education and Music are integral parts of the curriculum. Theatrical productions, fairs and student assemblies, are also an important part of school life. All subjects are taught in English, with the exception of Physical Education and Spanish.

The Lower Primary (ages 3–7 years) consists of the Pre-Kinder, Kinder, Preparatoria and 1st Grade classes, with class sizes varying between 25 and 28 students. The generous staffing allows children in the Lower Primary to be taught for a significant part of their day in half groups. The youngest children follow the Foundation Stage Curriculum of England within a Reggio Emilia learning philosophy. There is a clear emphasis on hands-on, multi-sensory activities based on the students' own experiences. As the students begin to develop an awareness of the world around them, they are also introduced to the concepts of reading, writing and numbers. Students also follow a separate Spanish curriculum.

The Upper Primary part of the school comprises 2nd grade through to 5th grade and also provides the students with an education based on the English National Curriculum and the International Primary Curriculum. Class sizes vary between 23 and 28 students with some of the lessons taught in half classes and smaller groups. Students in Upper Primary continue to follow a cross-curricular approach to learning incorporating Information and Communication Technology (ICT), Citizenship and 'Life Skills" (Personal, Social and Health Education or PSHE) together with lessons on major Salvadoran environmental and historical issues, which are included in the educational programme.

Students in the Upper Primary section also follow a separate Spanish curriculum, although many of the concepts which are taught in Science, Mathematics and Humanities, are also covered in Spanish. In this way, important concepts are reinforced and students learn much of the vocabulary in both languages.

Secondary school 
The Secondary School is led by the Head of Secondary, the Deputy Head and a Secondary Leadership Team. The Secondary Section has over 60 members of staff including teachers and support staff and is organised into curriculum areas which are coordinated by Heads of Department. The school achieves relatively high academic standards.

Grades 6 to 8: for teaching purposes, each grade is divided into five classes with approximately 20 students per class. Generally, students are taught in mixed ability groups although there is some setting in Mathematics and Science. All students study a broad and balanced core of subjects: English, Mathematics, Science, Spanish, History, Geography, Art/Technology, Music, Drama, ICT, French and Physical Education. As far as is practical, the school follows the requirements of the English National Curriculum with adaptations for local conditions and opportunities.

Grades 9 and 10: students follow a 2-year course leading to the International General Certificate of Secondary Education (IGCSE) from the University of Cambridge. As well as studying the English Language, and Literature, Spanish Language and Literature, Mathematics, Physics, Chemistry and Biology students have the option of studying History, Geography, Economics, Computer Studies, Music, Art, French or Drama. One of these is expected to be a humanities option. 

Grade 11 and 12: students follow the 2-year International Baccalaureate Diploma Programme. In addition to studying English, Spanish, Mathematics, a Science subject (Physics, Chemistry, Biology) and a Humanities subject (Psychology, Geography, History, Economics, Business Management, Information Technology in a Global Society).  Students are also able to choose a sixth subject from French, Art & Design, Film Studies, Theatre Studies, Computer Science, a second Science subject or a second Humanities subject. Three subjects are studied at Higher Level and three at Standard Level. Students undertake a Theory of Knowledge Course, write an extended essay, and undertake community service.

In addition to the IGCSE and IB examinations, the school also facilitates TOEFL, PSAT and SAT examinations and offers vocational tests.

All graduating Salvadoran students also sit for the national PAES examination which, together with their studies for IB, allows them to gain the Salvadoran Bachillerato (school leaving certificate).

Students who are not achieving their full potential may be referred to the Learning Support Unit (LSU), staffed by qualified educational psychologists, who help the teachers and students through a diagnosis of problems and the design of individualised teaching and learning strategies.

For pastoral and many extra-curricular purposes the Secondary School is "Tribally" based. There are Heads of Year in charge of their respective year group and tutor teams. There is a tutor period to deal with pastoral matters at the start of each school day.

Extracurricular activities: a full programme of extra-curricular activities is offered ranging from sports to the arts. The school has a Tribal (i.e. "House") system of internal school competitions. The school also prepares students to compete within various national and international competitions under the Team Sports Programme.

The school has a Prefect body (including Head students) and also an elected Student Council. There is an ‘in-house'-produced school magazine.

The school actively supports the local community through its many student-led charitable projects. This takes the form of fundraising efforts to actual hands-on work in local old people's and children's homes. Students gain credit for this in the International Baccalaureate's Creativity, Action and Service programme (CAS).

School graduates: on average, 80 – 90 students graduate from the ABC each academic year. Of these, 45–50% graduate with Honours, and around 90% obtain the IB Bilingual Diploma, with the remaining students obtaining individual IB subject certificates.

The exact numbers vary from Class to class but following graduation generally, up to half of the students go on to study at universities within the United States or Canada, some go to the United Kingdom and other European countries, others go to other Latin American universities including Costa Rica and Mexico while the remainder enter local Salvadoran Universities.

School facilities

Shared whole-school facilities 
There is a lecture/drama theatre with seating for 108, a drama studio and a multi-purpose and media-equipped performing arts centre that can seat up to 500 provides an excellent setting for assemblies, musical and drama productions, meeting and performing spaces and art exhibition area.

There is also an auditorium block housing the music department, which consists of a large band room plus three music classrooms and separate practice areas.

School owned laptops are used in both Primary and Secondary Schools and students in Grades 9 and up are required to have their own laptop.

Primary school facilities 
The Lower Primary area accommodates the younger students from 3 to 6 years old. This area has 18 single-story, purpose-built classrooms. Each classroom has a computer and large monitor with Internet and intranet access, as well as its own outdoor patio area. All classes in the Lower Primary section have the use of a grassed playground and a solar-heated swimming pool. This section also features an office area, music room, first aid post, assembly area, staff room and Sala Cuna (where children waiting for their parents are taken care of).

The Upper Primary area of the school accommodates the students from 6 to 11 years. Here, there are 22 single-storey classrooms, the Art room, and the Jubilee Building, which houses a combined Library/computer area, together with a Science suite, staff room and offices. The 1st, 2nd, and 3rd grade are housed in single-story classroom blocks which also include a Spanish room, the Learning Support Unit and a school resource room. A two-story block of 6 classrooms houses the 4th and 5th grade. All of the Upper Primary classrooms are also equipped with a computer and large monitor with Internet and intranet access, and laptop carts are available for student use. The two Upper Primary playground areas incorporate an outdoor theatre, adventure playground and small games areas.

Secondary school facilities 
The Secondary School has 30 classrooms each with a PC computer, large monitor and a digital projector.  Departments have access to laptop trolleys to facilitate their use in the classrooms and a state-of-the-art Learning Resources Centre (winner of a Central American environmental design award) with a central area housing 24 Apple Macs. There are 10 well-resourced science laboratories and 3 large Art and Design rooms.

References 

British international schools in North America
Educational institutions established in 1970
International schools in El Salvador
1970 establishments in El Salvador